Bahuria Union (Bengali:বহুরিয়া ইউনিয়ন) is a union of Mirzapur Upazila, Tangail District, Bangladesh. It is situated  11 km north of Mirzapur and 38 km southeast of Tangail, The district headquarter.

Demographics
According to Population Census 2011 performed by Bangladesh Bureau of Statistics, The total population of Bahuria union is 21404. There are  4985 households in total.

Education
The literacy rate of Bahuria Union is 52.2% (Male-55.7%, Female-49.1%).

See also
 Union Councils of Tangail District

References

Populated places in Dhaka Division
Populated places in Tangail District
Unions of Mirzapur Upazila